Shen Binyi (born December 1944)  is a vice admiral in the People's Liberation Army Navy (PLAN) of China. He was an alternate member of the 14th and 15th Central Committee of the Chinese Communist Party. He was a member of the 16th Central Committee of the Chinese Communist Party. He was a member of the Standing Committee of the 11th Chinese People's Political Consultative Conference.

Biography
Shen was born in Yiwu County (now Yiwu), Zhejiang, in December 1944. He enlisted in the People's Liberation Army (PLA) in December 1964, and joined the Chinese Communist Party (CCP) in December 1966. Starting in December 1965, he worked in the PLA Navy. He was chief of staff of the Fujian Naval Base in August 1985, deputy chief of staff of the East China Sea Fleet in October 1989, and commander of the Shanghai Naval Base in August 1991. He was promoted to assistant head of the People's Liberation Army General Logistics Department in March 1993. In December 1994, he was promoted again to become deputy head. In December 1999, he was commissioned as deputy commander of the PLA Navy, serving in the post until his retirement in December 2004.

He was promoted to the rank of rear admiral (shaojiang) in 1990 and vice admiral (zhongjiang) in 1996.

References

1944 births
Living people
People from Yiwu
PLA National Defence University alumni
People's Liberation Army generals from Zhejiang
People's Republic of China politicians from Zhejiang
Chinese Communist Party politicians from Zhejiang
Members of the Standing Committee of the 11th Chinese People's Political Consultative Conference